The Popular Resistance of the Eastern Region ( al-Muqāwama ash-Shaʿbiyya fīl-Minṭaqa ash-Sharqiyya); also called the Popular Resistance in Raqqa ( al-Muqāwama ash-Shaʿbiyya fīr-Raqqah) is a pro-government militant group in Syria. It wages a guerrilla campaign against the Syrian Democratic Forces, the armed forces of the Kurdish-dominated proto-state of Rojava, as well as the United States.

Background 
When the Syrian Civil War broke out, various rebel factions took control of much of eastern Syria. After a period of infighting among the insurgents, the Islamic State of Iraq and the Levant (ISIL) emerged victorious and absorbed or expelled other rebel groups from eastern Syria. Regardless of these developments, a large part of the civilian population living under rebel and later ISIL rule remained secretly supportive of the Syrian government. Eventually, ISIL was mostly defeated by the Kurdish-led Syrian Democratic Forces (SDF) who took control of its territories. Many government loyalists regarded the SDF which was supported by foreigners such as the United States Armed Forces as just another illegitimate occupier. Furthermore, the new SDF-backed civilian administration in areas such as Raqqa proved unable to fully alleviate the local humanitarian crisis. Support for the government thus underwent a resurgence.

History 
On 26 February 2018, loyalist militants in Raqqa officially banded together to fight the SDF and U.S. troops, and announced the foundation of the "Popular Resistance of the Eastern Region" or "Popular Resistance in Raqqa". In its first statement, the group framed its actions as struggle against the "tyrannical American enemy" and pro-American "terrorists from all corners of the earth" [i.e. the SDF]. Around the same time, Raqqa Is Being Slaughtered Silently claimed that the "Shield of the Al-Jazira Heroes", a pro-government insurgent group was being set up in Raqqa's countryside. The combat capabilities of the "Popular Resistance" remained unclear; the group's first video showed just a few masked men with guns. The pro-opposition site Baladi News alleged that it was part of the pro-government forces that were fighting alongside the SDF against Turkey in the Afrin Region without providing any proof.

The group is allegedly supported by Iran, and trained by the Baqir Brigade, a unit of the Syrian Armed Forces.

Following its foundation, the group recruited locals opposed to the SDF's policies in Raqqa such as forced conscription, and the new administration's perceived lack of care for the interests and needs of the local people. The Popular Resistance of the Eastern Region uses Facebook to post content and has posted pictures and videos of supporters expressing their approval of the movement in ways such as raising Syrian flags, pictures of leaflets with pro-group writings and video statements. Videos of attacks on American forces and allied SDF militias have also been posted by the group. The group claimed in April 2018 to have carried out two attacks on U.S. positions at Ayn Issa, but these claims remained uncorroborated and were denied by the SDF. Overall, the group appears to be more focused on civil actions and propaganda than waging an actual insurgency. On 2 April 2018, another pro-government faction with a similar background emerged in the al-Hasakah Governorate.

On 14 March 2019, two attacks reportedly targeted SDF convoys in Raqqa. According to the pro-government al-Masdar News, "some activists" claimed that the Popular Resistance of the Eastern Region was responsible for the attacks.

See also
 Al-Awda (guerrilla organization)

References

2018 establishments in Syria
Anti-Americanism
Anti-Kurdish sentiment
Arab nationalism in Syria
Arab nationalist militant groups
Organizations based in Syria
Pro-government factions of the Syrian civil war
Rebel groups in Syria
Axis of Resistance